This list of Ports and harbours in Algeria details the ports, harbours around the coast of Algeria.

List of ports and harbours in Algeria

External links

References

Ports

Algeria